Komunisti, was a daily newspaper published by the Georgian Communist Party Central Committee. The first number was issued on June 3, 1920 in Tbilisi as the daily organ of the Communist Party of Georgia and the Central Committee of the Communist Party, named "New Communist". After the publication of 10 numbers, the newspaper was closed down by the General-Governor of Tbilisi. During the first government of independent Georgia the newspaper was named "Georgia Communist". After the establishment of the Soviet government in Georgia on March 2, 1921, it was renamed Komunisti.

Komunisti reflected all the important periods of the history of the Georgian SSR, supporting the CPSU and the Government's decisions. The newspaper covered topics about policy, economics, industry, agriculture, literature, arts, education and other issues. The newspaper had its additions – journals Torch (1923–1925), Science and Technology (1925–1926), Flag (1929–1934), and Agriculture (1958).

Komunisti was awarded the Order of Red Banner of the 1950s. The newspaper ceased to exist after the dissolution of the USSR and the restoration of Georgian independence.

References 

Communist newspapers
Eastern Bloc mass media
Newspapers published in the Soviet Union
Newspapers published in Georgia (country)
Newspapers established in 1920
Publications of the Communist Party of the Soviet Union